The Anderson News is a weekly newspaper, founded in 1877, serving Lawrenceburg, Kentucky and the rest of Anderson County, Kentucky.

It is published on Wednesdays and has a circulation of approximately 6,000, with a Monday advertising supplement called The Anderson News Extra, featuring display advertising and local and syndicated news content, with a circulation of 11,500.

The paper is owned by Landmark Community Newspapers, Inc., a division of Landmark Communications.Anderson County, Ky, p. 59 (1991)

References

External links 
The Anderson News website

Publications established in 1877
Anderson County, Kentucky
Newspapers published in Kentucky
1877 establishments in Kentucky